The 1836 Missouri gubernatorial election was held on August 1, 1832.  Sitting Lt. Governor Lilburn Boggs, was elected over sitting Congressman (and former Lt. Governor) William Henry Ashley.

Results

References

Missouri
1836
Gubernatorial
August 1836 events